Copernicia curbeloi is a palm which is endemic to Cuba.

References

curbeloi
Trees of Cuba
Plants described in 1931